State Highway 251 (SH 251) is a Texas state highway running between Olney and Newcastle.  The route was designated on June 22, 1937 from Newcastle south to Old Fort Belknap, and was extended northward to Olney mainly along its current route on September 26, 1939 when SH 24 was rerouted. The section from Newcastle to the fort was removed on February 23, 1993 and transferred to FM 61. One small section in Newcastle was transferred to FM 926

Junction list

References

251
Transportation in Young County, Texas